USS LST-491 was the lead ship of her class of tank landing ships built for the United States Navy during World War II. Like many of her class, she was not named and is properly referred to by her hull designation.

Construction and commissioning
LST-491 was laid down on 29 July 1943, at Evansville, Indiana, by the Missouri Valley Bridge & Iron Company; launched on 23 September 1943; sponsored by Mrs. Barton Cook; and commissioned on 3 December 1943.

Service history
During World War II, LST-491 was assigned to the European Theater and participated in the Invasion of Normandy in June 1944, and the invasion of southern France in August and September 1944. She was then assigned to the Asiatic-Pacific Theater and took part in the assault and occupation of Okinawa Gunto in May and June 1945.

Following the war, LST-491 performed occupation duty in the Far East until early January 1946. The tank landing ship returned to the United States and was decommissioned on 12 January 1946. She was loaned to the Japanese government on 31 March 1952, and operated under the Shipping Control Authority, Japan.

The ship was later operated by Military Sea Transportation Service (MSTS), later the Military Sealift Command (MSC), Pacific and redesignated USNS T-LST-491.

The ship was struck from the Naval Vessel Register in June 1975 and transferred to the Philippine Navy on 13 September 1976. Her final fate is unknown.
 
LST-491 earned three battle stars for World War II service.

References

Bibliography

See also
 List of United States Navy LSTs

 

LST-491-class tank landing ships
World War II amphibious warfare vessels of the United States
Cold War amphibious warfare vessels of the United States
Ships built in Evansville, Indiana
1943 ships